The Scottish Theatre Forum is a website dedicated to the performing arts in Scotland and designed for use by anyone interested in amateur or professional theatre in the country. It was founded in February 2006 and is owned by Mark Grieve.

Charity work
The forum and its members have been involved in charity work, including organising a production of We Will Rock You in 2007 to raise money for Edinburgh's Royal Hospital for Sick Children, and helping with the fundraising appeal for Dunfermline's Alhambra Theatre.

References

External links
 Facebook page

Theatre information and review websites
Entertainment Internet forums
Internet properties established in 2006
Scottish websites
Theatre in Scotland
2006 establishments in Scotland